The Suzhou New District is one of the specially designated regions for technological and industrial development in China.

The district is managed by the New High-Tech Industrial Company Ltd., which, in turn, is owned by the Suzhou government.

History
Suzhou New District was established by the Central People's Government on November 18, 1992. It was one of the first industry parks opened to attract foreign investors from APEC countries. It served as an export base for technology-related services and products in China.

In 2003, the district's total output value is 25.1 billion yuan. Industrial sales of 70.06 billion yuan, The local budget revenue was 1.53 billion yuan and export of US$8.76 billion. Up to the end of 2003, the district has attracted a total of over 800 foreign projects including 40 multinational corporations. Foreign investment has reached over US$6 billion while the actually utilized investment reached US$3.4 billion. The district attracts many different types of industries, including consumer electronics, information technology, precision instruments, biotechnology, and pharmaceuticals.

Developments
The Suzhou New District was the first APEC hi-tech development zone to be approved by the Foreign Ministry and Science and Technology Ministry and receive ISO 14000 certification. The National Bureau of Environmental Protection conferred it the title "ISO 14000 National Demonstration Zone".

Education

The Japanese School of Suzhou is in the district. It formerly housed the Suzhou Japanese Saturday School, which had classes held at the Suzhou Foreign Language School in Suzhou New District.

See also
Dongzhu
Suzhou Industrial Park

References

External links
Suzhou National New and Hi-Tech industrial Development Zone
Brief overview of the Suzhou New District in English
National Level EDZ—Suzhou New and Hi-tech District & Huqiu District
Suzhou New District and New High-Tech Industrial Company, Limited
Jordan Suchow, org. regional tech operator

Administrative divisions of Suzhou
Special Economic Zones of China